Passing is the ability of a person to be regarded as a member of an identity group or category, such as racial identity, ethnicity, caste, social class, sexual orientation, gender, religion, age and/or disability status, that is often different from their own. Passing may be used to increase social acceptance in order to cope with stigma by removing stigma from the presented self and could result in other social benefits as well. Thus, passing may serve as a form of self-preservation or self-protection in instances where expressing one's true or prior identity may be dangerous. Passing may require acceptance into a community and may also lead to temporary or permanent leave from another community to which an individual previously belonged. Thus, passing can result in separation from one's original self, family, friends, or previous living experiences. While successful passing may contribute to economic security, safety, and avoidance of stigma, it may take an emotional toll as a result of denial of one's previous identity and may lead to depression or self-loathing. When an individual deliberately attempts to 'pass' as a member of an identity group, they may actively engage in performance of behaviors they believe to be associated with membership of that group. Passing practices can also include information management where the passer attempts to control or conceal any stigmatizing information that may reveal disparity from their presumed identity.

Etymologically, the term is simply the nominalisation of the verb pass in its phrasal use with for or as, as in a counterfeit passing for the genuine article or an impostor passing as another person. It has been in popular use since at least the late 1920s.

Academic framework 

Passing, as a sociological concept, was first coined by Erving Goffman as a term for one response to possessing some kind of, often less visible, stigma. Stigma, according to Goffman's framework in his work Stigma: Notes on the Management of Spoiled Identity (1963), "refer[s] to an attribute that is deeply discrediting" or "an undesired differentness from what [was] anticipated".  According to Goffman, "This discrepancy, when known about or apparent, spoils his social identity; it has the effect of cutting him off from society and from himself so that he stands a discredited person facing an unaccepting world". Thus, inhabiting an identity associated with stigma can be particularly dangerous and harmful. According to Link and Phelan, Roschelle and Kaufman, and Marvasti, it can lead to loss of opportunities due to status loss and discrimination, alienation and marginalization, harassment and embarrassment, and social rejection. These can be a persistent source of psychological issues.

To resist, manage, and avoid stigma and its associated consequences, individuals might choose to pass as a non-stigmatized identity. According to Nathan Shippee, "Passing communicates a seemingly "normal" self, one that does not apparently possess the stigma." According to Patrick Kermit, "To be suspected of being "not quite human" is the essence of stigmatisation, and passing is a desperate means to the end of appearing fully human in the sense of being like most other people."

When making the decision of whether to pass or not, there are many factors stigmatized actors may consider. First, there is the notion of visibility. How visible their stigma is may problematize how much ease or difficulty they may face in attempting to pass. However, how visible their stigma is may also determine the intensity and frequency of adversity they may face from others as a result of their stigma. Goffman explains that "Traditionally, the question of passing has raised the issue of the "visibility" of a particular stigma, that is, how well or how badly-the stigma is adapted to provide means of communicating that the individual possesses it." Other scholars further emphasize the cruciality of visibility and conclude that "whether a stigma is evident to the audience can mark the difference between being discredited or merely discreditable". Other factors can include risk, context, and intimacy. Different contexts and situations may make passing more easy or difficult and/or more safe or risky. How well others know the passer may impede their abilities as well. One scholar explains "Individuals may pass in some situations but not others, effectively creating different arenas of life (depending on whether the stigma is known or not). Goffman claimed that actors develop theories about which situations are risky for disclosure, but risk is only one factor: intimacy with the audience can lead actors to disclose, or to feel guilty for not doing so." In addition to guilt, since passing can sometimes involve the fabrication of a false personal history to aid in concealment of their stigma, passing can complicate personal relationships and cause feelings of shame at having to be dishonest about their identity. According to Goffman, "It can be assumed that the possession of a discreditable secret failing takes on a deeper meaning when the persons to whom the individual has not yet revealed himself are not strangers to him but friends. Discovery prejudices not only the current social situation, but established relationships as well; not only the current image others present have of him, but also the one they will have in the future; not only appearances, but also reputation." Relating to this experience of passing, actors may have an ambivalent attachment to their stigma that can cause them to fluctuate between acceptance and rejection of their stigmatized identity. Thus, there may be times when the stigmatized individual will feel more inclined to pass and others when they feel less inclined.

Despite all of the potentially distressing and dangerous parts of passing, some passers have expressed a habituation with it. In one study, Shippee accounts that "participants often portrayed it as a normal or mundane event." For those whose stigma invites particularly hostile responses from majorities of society, passing may become a regular part of everyday life, necessary for survival in that society.

Regardless, the stigma that passers are subject to is not inherent. As Goffman explains, stigma exists not within the person but between an attribute and an audience. As a result, stigma is socially constructed, differing based on the cultural beliefs, social structures, and situational dynamics of various contexts. Thus, passing is also immersed in different contexts of the socially structured meaning and behavior of daily life and passing implies familiarity with that knowledge.

Passing has been interpreted in sociology and cultural studies through different analytical lenses, including as information management per Goffman and as cultural performance per Bryant Keith Alexander.

Passing as information management 
Goffman defines passing as 'the management of undisclosed discrediting information about self." Similarly, other scholars add that "Passing is mostly associated with strategies of information management that the discreditable use to pass for normal [in everyday life]". Whereas some individuals' stigma is immediately apparent, passers deal with different problems in that their stigma is not always so obvious. Goffman elaborates "The issue is not that of managing tension generated during social contacts, but rather that of managing information about his failing. To display or not to display; to tell or not to tell; to let on or not to let on; to lie or not to lie; and in each case, to whom, how, when, and where."

In Goffman's understanding, individuals possess various symbols that convey social information about us. There are prestige symbols that convey creditable information and there are stigma symbols that convey discrediting information. By managing the visibility and apparentness of their stigma symbols, passers prevent others from learning of their discredited and stigmatized status and remain discreditable. Passing can also include the adoption of certain prestige symbols as well as a personal history or biography of social information that aids to conceal and draw attention away from their actual stigmatized status.

Goffman also notes offhandedly that "The concealment of creditable facts-reverse passing-of course occurs". Reverse passing, related to terms like "blackfishing", has emerged as a topic of discourse as critics raise concerns over cultural appropriation and accuse nonstigmatized individuals, such as prominent celebrities Kim Kardashian and Ariana Grande, of concealing creditable information about themselves for some social benefit. Notions of cultural appropriation, racial fetishization, and reverse passing particularly entered public debate in 2015 after former college instructor and president of the Spokane, Washington NAACP, Rachel Dolezal, was discovered to be white with no black racial heritage, after presenting herself as black for several years. As many point out, reverse passing crucially differs from passing in that individuals who reverse pass are not stigmatized and therefore are not subject to the harms of stigma that may force stigmatized individuals to pass.

Passing as cultural performance 
Bryant Keith Alexander, a professor of Communication, Performance and Cultural Studies at Loyola Marymount University, defines cultural performance as "a process of delineation using performative practices to mark membership and association". Using this definition, passing is reframed as a method to maintain cultural performance and choose both consciously and unconsciously to participate in other performances. Rather than through the management of symbols and the social information they convey, passers assume "the necessary and performative strategies that signal membership". Alexander reiterates "Cultural membership is thus maintained primarily through recognizable performative practices." Hence, to successfully pass is to have your cultural performance assessed and validated by others.

With this interpretation, avoiding stigma by passing necessitates intimate understanding and awareness of social constructions of meaning and expected behaviors that signal membership. Shippee explains that "far from merely appraising situations to determine when concealment is required, passing encompasses active interpretations of several aspects of social life. It requires an understanding of cultural conventions, namely: what is considered "normal" and what is required to maintain it; customs of everyday interaction; and the symbolic character of the stigma itself. . .Passing, then, embodies a creative mobilization of situational and cultural awareness, structural considerations, self-appraisals, and sense-making". Recognizing this, Alexander asserts then that "passing is a product (an assessed state), a process (an active engagement), performative (ritualized repetition of communicative acts), and a reflection of one's positionality (politicized location), knowing that its existential accomplishment always resides in liminality."

Ethnicity and race

  

Historically and genealogically, the term passing has referred to mixed-race, or biracial Americans identifying as or being perceived as belonging to a different racial group.  In Passing and the Fictions of Identity, Elaine Ginsberg cites an ad for escaped slave Edmund Kenney as an example of racial passing; Edmund Kenney, a biracial person, was able to pass as white in the United States in the 1800s. In the entry "Passing" for the GLBTQ Encyclopedia Project, Tina Gianoulis states, "for light-skinned African Americans during the times of slavery and the intense periods of racial resegregation that followed, passing for white was a survival tool that allowed them to gain education and employment that would have been denied them had they been recognized as "colored" people." The term passing has since been expanded to include other ethnicities and identity categories. Discriminated groups in North America and Europe may modify their accents, word choices, manner of dress, grooming habits, and even names in an attempt to appear to be members of a majority group or of a privileged minority group.

Nella Larsen's 1929 novella, Passing, helped to establish the term after several years of prior use. The writer and subject of the novella is a mixed African-American/Caucasian who passes for white. The novella was written during the Harlem Renaissance, when passing was commonly found in both reality and fiction. Since the Civil Rights Movement of the 1960s, racial pride decreased the weight given to passing as an important issue for black Americans. Still, it is possible and common for biracial people to pass based on appearance or by hiding or omitting their backgrounds.

In "Adjusting the Borders: Bisexual Passing and Queer Theory," Lingel discusses bell hooks' notion of racial passing in conjunction with discussion of bisexual engagement in passing.

Romani people have a history of passing as well, particularly in the United States, often telling outsiders they belong to other ethnicities such as Latino, Greek, Middle Eastern or Native American.

Social class and caste
Class passing, similar to racial and gender passing, is the concealment or misrepresentation of one's social class.  In Class-Passing: Social Mobility in Film and Popular Culture, Gwendolyn Audrey Foster suggests racial and gender passing is often stigmatized, while class passing is generally accepted as normative behavior. Class passing is common in the United States and is linked to the notions of the American Dream and of upward class mobility.

Popular culture
English-language novels which feature class passing include The Talented Mr. Ripley, Anne of Green Gables, and Horatio Alger novels. Films featuring class-passing characters include Catch Me If You Can, My Fair Lady, Pinky, ATL, and Andy Hardy Meets Debutante. Class passing also figures into reality television programs such as Joe Millionaire: contestants are often immersed in displays of great material wealth or may have to conceal their class status.

Sexuality and gender

The perception of an individual's sexual orientation is often based on their visual identity. The term visual identity refers to the expression of personal, social, and cultural identities through dress and appearance. In Visible Lesbians and Invisible Bisexuals: Appearance and Visual Identities Among Bisexual Women it is proposed that through the expression of a visual identity, others 'read' a person's appearance and make assumptions about their wider identity. Therefore, visual identity is a prominent tool of non-verbal communication. The concept of passing is showcased in the research done by Jennifer Taub in her work Bisexual Women and Beauty Norms. Some participants in the study stated that they attempted to dress as what they perceived as heterosexual when partnered with a man while others stated that they tried to dress more like a 'lesbian'. This exemplifies how visual identities can greatly alter people's immediate assumptions of sexuality. Therefore, by presenting oneself as 'heterosexual' one is effectively 'passing'.

Passing by sexual orientation occurs when an individual's perceived sexual orientation or sexuality differs from the sexuality or sexual orientation with which they identify. In the entry "Passing" for the glbtq Encyclopedia Project, Tina Gianoulis notes "the presumption of heterosexuality in most modern cultures," which in some parts of the world, such as the United States, may be effectively compulsory, "most gay men and lesbians in fact spend a great deal of their lives passing as straight even when they do not do so intentionally." The phrase "in the closet" may be used to describe an individual who is hiding or concealing their sexual orientation. In Passing: Identity and Interpretation in Sexuality, Race, and Religion, Maria Sanchez and Linda Schlossberg state "the dominant social order often implores gay people to stay in the closet (to pass)." Individuals may choose to remain "in the closet," or pass as heterosexual, for a variety of reasons. Examples of such reasons include a desire to maintain positive relationships with family and policies or requirements associated with employment. "Don't Ask, Don't Tell" was an example of a policy that required passing as heterosexual within the military or armed forces.

Due to bisexual erasure, some bisexual individuals may feel the need to engage in passing within presumed predominantly heterosexual circles as well as even within LGBTQ circles for fear of stigma. In Adjusting the Borders: Bisexual Passing and Queer Theory, Jessica Lingel writes "The ramifications of being denied a public sphere in which to practice a sexual identity that isn't labeled licentious or opportunistic leads some women to resort to manufacturing profiles of gayness or straightness to pledge membership within a community."

Gender passing refers to when an individual is perceived as belonging to a gender identity group that differs from the gender with which they were assigned at birth. In Passing and the Fictions of Identity, Elaine Ginsberg provides the story of Brandon Teena as an example of gender passing in the United States. He was assigned female at birth, but lived as a man. In 1993, Brandon moved to Falls City, Nebraska, where he initially was able to pass as a man; however, when community members discovered that Brandon had been assigned female at birth, two men in the community shot and murdered Brandon. Ginsberg further cites Billy Tipton, a jazz musician who was also assigned female at birth, but lived and performed as a man until his death in 1989, as another example of gender passing. Within the transgender community, passing refers to the perception or recognition of a trans individual as belonging to the gender identity to which they are transitioning rather than the sex or gender they were assigned at birth.

Religion

Passing as a member of a different religion or as not religious at all is not uncommon among minority religious communities. In the entry "Passing" for the GLBTQ Encyclopedia Project, Tina Gianoulis states "at times of rabid anti-Semitism in Europe and the Americas, many Jewish families also either converted to Christianity or passed as Christian" for the sake of survival. Circumcised Jewish males in Germany during World War II attempted to restore their foreskins as part of passing as Gentile. The film Europa, Europa explores this theme. In Shia Islam there is the doctrine of taqiyya, whereby one is lawfully allowed to disavow Islam and profess another faith (whilst secretly remaining a Muslim) if one's life is at risk. The concept has also been practised by various minority faiths in the Middle East such as the Alawites and Druze.

Ability or disability 
Disability passing may refer to the intentional concealment of impairment in order to avoid the stigma of disability; however, it may also describe the exaggeration of an ailment or impairment in order to receive some benefit, which may take the form of attention or care. In Disability and Passing: Blurring the Lines of Identity, Jeffrey Brune and Daniel Wilson define passing by ability or disability as "the ways that others impose, intentionally or not, a specific disability or non-disability identity on a person." Similarly, in "Compulsory Able-Bodiedness and Queer/Disabled Existence," Robert McRuer argues that "the system of compulsory able-bodiedness...produces disability."

Passing as disabled 
People with disabilities may exaggerate their disabilities when being evaluated for medical care or accommodations, often for fear of being denied support. "There are too many agencies out there with the ostensible purpose of helping us that still believe that as long as we technically can do something, like crab-walking our way into a subway station, we should have to do it," writes Gabe Moses, a wheelchair user who has a limited ability to walk. These pressures can result in disabled people exaggerating symptoms or tiring out their body before an evaluation so that they are seen on a "bad day" instead of a "good day."

In sports, some mobility impaired individuals have been observed strategically exaggerating the extent of their disability in order to pass as more disabled than they are and be placed in divisions where they may be more competitive. In quadriplegic rugby, or wheelchair rugby, some players are described as having 'incomplete' quadriplegia in which they may retain some sensation and function in their lower limbs that can allow them to stand and walk in limited capacities. Based on a rule from the United States Quad Rugby Association predicating that players only need a combination of upper and lower extremity impairment that precludes them from playing able-bodied sports, these incomplete quads can play alongside other quadriplegics who have no sensation or function in their lower limbs. This is justified by classifications the USQRA has developed where certified physical therapists compare arm and muscle flexibility, trunk and torso movement, and ease of chair operation between players and rank them by injury level. Yet, thanks to inconsistencies between medical diagnoses of injury and these classifications, players are able to perform higher levels of impairment for the classifiers and pass as more disabled than they may actually be. As a result, their ranking may underestimate their capacity and they may attain a competitive advantage over teams with players whose capacity is not equivalent. This policy has raised questions from some about the ethics and fairness of comparing disabilities, as well as about how competition, inclusion, and ability should be defined in the world of sports.

Passing as non-disabled 
Individuals whose disabilities are "invisible," such as people with mental illness, intellectual or cognitive disabilities, or physical disabilities that are not immediately obvious to others such as IBS, Crohn's disease or ulcerative colitis, may choose whether or not to reveal their identity or to pass as "normal." While passing as non-disabled may protect against discrimination, it could also result in lack of support or accusations of faking.

Autistic people may employ strategies known as "masking" or "camouflaging" in order to pass as non-disabled. This can involve behavior like suppressing or redirecting repetitive movements, avoiding talking about one's interests, or faking a smile in an environment that feels uncomfortable or distressing. Masking may be done to reduce the risk of ostracism or abuse. Autistic masking is correlated with a higher risk of depression and suicide. It can also lead to exhaustion.

Individuals with visible physical impairments or disabilities, such as people with mobility impairment, including individuals who use wheelchairs or scooters, face greater challenges in concealing their disability.

In a study on individuals' experience with prosthetics, the ability of users to be able to pass as if they were 'like everybody else' with their prosthetic based on the realistic or unrealistic appearance of the prosthetic was one factor in predicting whether patients would accept or reject prosthetic use. Though cosmetic prosthetics that, for example, were skin-colored or had the added appearance of veins, hair, and nails were often harder to adapt to and use, many expressed preference for them over more functional, more conspicuous prosthetics in order to maintain personal conceptions of social and bodily identity. One prosthesis-user characterized her device as one that could "maintain her humanness ('half way human'), which in turn prevented her, quite literally, from being seen to have an 'odd' body". Prosthesis-users also discussed wanting prosthetics that could help them maintain a walking gait that wouldn't attract stares and prosthetics that could be disguised or concealed under clothes in efforts to pass as able-bodied.

Intersectional 
Though passing may occur on the basis of a single subordinate identity such as race, often people's intersectional locations involve multiple marginalized identities.  Intersectionality provides a framework for seeing the interconnected nature of oppressive systems and how multiple identities interact within them.  Gay Asian men possess two key subordinated identities which, in combination, create unique challenges for them when passing. Sometimes these men must pass as straight to avoid stigma but around other gay men they may attempt to pass as a non-racialized person or white to avoid the disinterest or fetishization often encountered upon revealing their Asian identities. By recognizing the hidden intersection of the gendered aspects of gay and Asian male stereotypes, these two distinct experiences make even more sense. Gay men are often stereotyped as effeminate and thereby insufficiently masculine as men. Stereotypes characterizing Asian men as too sexual (overly masculine) or too feminine (hypo-masculine) or even both also exhibit the gendered nature of racial stereotypes. Thus, passing as the dominant racial or sexuality category also often means passing as gender correct. When Black transgender men transition in the workplace from identifying as female to passing as cisgender men, gendered racial stereotypes characterizing Black men as overly masculine and violent can affect how previously acceptable behaviors will be interpreted.  As one such Black trans man discovered, he'd gone from "being an obnoxious Black woman to a scary Black man", and therefore had to adapt his behavior to gendered scripts to pass.

See also

 Beard (companion)
 Closeted
 Closet Jew
 Dramaturgy (sociology)
 Identity politics
 Masking (personality)
 Minority stress
 Model minority
 "On the Internet, nobody knows you're a dog"
 Stigma management
 Uncanny valley
 Undercover

Footnotes

 
Sociological terminology